The RIM-116 Rolling Airframe Missile (RAM) is a small, lightweight, infrared homing surface-to-air missile in use by the German, Japanese, Greek, Turkish, South Korean, Saudi Arabian, Egyptian, Mexican, UAE, and U.S. Navies. It was originally intended and used primarily as a point-defense weapon against anti-ship missiles. As its name indicates, RAM rolls as it flies. The missile must roll during flight because the RF tracking system uses a two-antenna interferometer that can measure phase interference of the electromagnetic wave in one plane only. The rolling interferometer permits the antennas to look at all planes of incoming energy. In addition, because the missile rolls, only one pair of steering canards is required. , it is the only U.S. Navy missile to operate in this manner.

The Rolling Airframe Missiles, together with the Mk 49 Guided Missile Launching System (GMLS) and support equipment, make up the RAM Mk 31 Guided Missile Weapon System (GMWS). The Mk-144 Guided Missile Launcher (GML) unit weighs  and stores 21 missiles. The original weapon cannot employ its own sensors prior to firing, so it must be integrated with a ship's combat system, which directs the launcher at targets. On U.S. ships, it is integrated with the AN/SWY-2 Ship Defense Surface Missile System (SDSMS) and Ship Self-Defense System (SSDS) Mk 1 or Mk 2-based combat systems. SeaRAM, a launcher variant equipped with independent sensors derived from the Vulcan Phalanx CIWS, is being installed on Littoral Combat Ships and certain s.

Development
The RIM-116 was developed by General Dynamics Pomona and Valley Systems divisions under a July 1976 agreement with Denmark and West Germany (the General Dynamics missile business was later acquired by Hughes Aircraft and is today part of Raytheon). Denmark dropped out of the program, but the U.S. Navy joined in as the major partner. The Mk 49 launcher was evaluated on board the destroyer  in the late 1980s. The first 30 missiles were built in FY85, and they became operational on 14 November 1992, onboard .
	
SeaRAM was developed in response to concerns about the performance of gun-based systems against modern supersonic sea-skimming anti-ship missiles. It was designed as a companion self-defense system to Phalanx,

Service
The RIM-116 is in service on several American and 30 German warships. All new German Navy warships will be equipped with the RAM, such as the new s, which will mount two RAM launchers per ship. The Greek Navy has equipped the new Super Vita–class fast attack craft with the RAM. South Korea has signed license-production contracts for their navy's KDX-II, KDX-III, and s.

U.S. Navy
The U.S. Navy plans to purchase a total of about 1,600 RAMs and 115 launchers to equip 74 ships. The missile is currently active aboard s, s, s, s,  ships, s, s, and littoral combat ships (LCS).

Variants

Block 0 

The original version of the missile, called Block 0, was based on the AIM-9 Sidewinder air-to-air missile, whose rocket motor, fuze, and warhead were used. Block 0 missiles were designed to initially home in on radiation emitted from a target (such as the active radar of an incoming anti-ship missile), switching to an infrared seeker derived from that of the FIM-92 Stinger missile for terminal guidance. In test firings, the Block 0 missiles achieved hit rates of over 95%.

Block 1
The Block 1 (RIM-116B) is an improved version of the RAM missile that adds an overall infrared-only guidance system that enables it to intercept missiles that are not emitting any radar signals. The Block 0's radar homing capabilities have been retained.

Block 2
The Block 2 (RIM-116C) is an upgraded version of the RAM missile aimed at more effectively countering more maneuverable anti-ship missiles through a four-axis independent control actuator system, increased rocket motor capability, an improved passive radio frequency seeker and upgraded components of the infrared seeker, and advanced kinematics. On 8 May 2007, the U.S. Navy awarded Raytheon Missile Systems a $105 million development contract; development was expected to be completed by December 2010. LRIP began in 2012. 51 missiles were initially ordered. On 22 October 2012, the RAM Block 2 completed its third guided test vehicle flight, firing two missiles in a salvo and directly hitting the target, to verify the system's command and control capabilities, kinematic performance, guidance system, and airframe capabilities. Raytheon was scheduled to deliver 25 Block 2 missiles during the program's integrated testing phase. The Block 2 RAM was delivered to the U.S. Navy in August 2014, with 502 missiles to be acquired from 2015 to 2019. Initial Operational Capability (IOC) for the Block 2 RAM was achieved on 15 May 2015.

In early 2018 the U.S. State Department approved the sale of RIM-116 Block II to the Mexican Navy for use on their future Sigma-class design frigates, the first of which was jointly built by Damen Schelde Naval Shipbuilding and launched in November 2018.

HAS mode
In 1998, a memorandum of understanding was signed by the defense departments of Germany and the United States to improve the system so that it could also engage so-called "HAS", Helicopter, Aircraft, and Surface targets. As developed, the HAS upgrade just required software modifications that can be applied to all Block 1 RAM missiles.

SeaRAM weapon system

The SeaRAM combines the radar and electro-optical system of the Phalanx CIWS Mk-15 Block 1B (CRDC) with an 11-cell RAM launcher to produce an autonomous system—one which does not need any external information to engage threats. Like the Phalanx, SeaRAM can be fitted to any class of ship. Due to the common mounting, SeaRAM inherits the relatively easy installation characteristics of its gun-based sibling, with Raytheon stating that SeaRAM "fits the exact shipboard installation footprint of the Phalanx, uses the same power and requires minimal shipboard modification". , one SeaRAM is fitted to each Independence-class vessel. In late 2014, the Navy revealed it had chosen to install the SeaRAM on its Small Surface Combatant LCS follow-on ships. Beginning in November 2015, the Navy will complete installation of a SeaRAM on the first of four s patrolling within the U.S. 6th Fleet. The SeaRAM will equip the Royal Saudi Navy's multi-mission surface combat (MMSC) based on the s.

General characteristics
Primary function: Surface-to-air missile

Contractor: Raytheon, Diehl BGT Defence

Block 1
 Length: 
 Diameter: 
 Fin span: 
 Speed: Mach 2.0+
 Warhead:  blast fragmentation
 Launch weight: 
 Range: 
 Guidance system: three modes—passive radio frequency/infrared homing, infrared only, or infrared dual-mode enabled (radio frequency and infrared homing)
 Unit cost: $998,000
 Date deployed: 1992

Block 1A
 Length: 
 Diameter: 
 Wingspan: 
 Weight: 
 Date deployed: August 1999

Block 2
 Length: 
 Diameter: 
 Wingspan: 
 Weight: 
 Date deployed: May 2015

Operators

Current operators

Future operators
The Dutch Ministry of Defence announced on 14 January 2021 that it wants to purchase the Rolling Airframe Missile for its new anti-submarine warfare frigates and the LPDs Rotterdam and Johan de Witt.

Gallery

See also 
Barak-1
FL-3000N
Sea Oryx
Sea Wolf missile
Umkhonto missile

References
Notes

Bibliography

External links 

 RIM-116 RAM Rolling Airframe Missile—GlobalSecurity.org
 RIM-116 RAM—Rolling Airframe Missile—waffenHQ.de
 Raytheon (General Dynamics) RIM-116 RAM—Designation Systems
 RAM on the Homepage of German developer and manufacturer Diehl BGT 

Close-in weapon systems
RIM116
RIM116
Raytheon Company products
Surface-to-air missiles of Germany
RIM116
Military equipment introduced in the 1990s